Judo has been contested  at the Pacific Games since 1969 when it was included in the Third South Pacific Games held in Port Moresby.| Judo has also been included at the Pacific Mini Games held at Port Vila in 2017.

Pacific Games
The Judo events (contested as weight classes as well as open divisions) at each Pacific Games are listed in the table below. Flag icons and three letter country code indicate the nationality of the gold medal winner of an event, where this information is known; otherwise an (X) is used. Moving the cursor onto a country code with a dotted underline will reveal the name of the gold medal winner.  A dash (–) indicates a division that was not contested.

Men's judo

Women's judo

Pacific Mini Games

Men's

Women's

See also
Judo at the Commonwealth Games
Judo at the Summer Olympics

Notes

References

 

 
Pacific Games
Pacific Games